is an anime TV series created by Production I.G and Masamune Shirow (known for the Ghost in the Shell and Appleseed franchises) under the directorship of Kazuhiro Furuhashi, produced in collaboration with broadcaster Nippon Television (NTV). The series revolves around an information network known as "The Metal", and the series centers on Masamichi Haru, a paraplegic old man who was in a coma for 50 years after a test dive using Meta-Real technology went horribly wrong. After awakening from his coma, he starts searching for the "answer in the sea".

The series aired on NTV and other channels from April 8, 2008 to October 1, 2008. A manga adaptation by Momotarou Miyano was serialized in Magazine Z from the April 2008 to January 2009, with two volumes sold between August 22, 2008 and February 23, 2009 by Kodansha. A light novel adaptation by Yoshinobu Akita was published by Kodansha on August 5, 2008.

Plot
2061 AD. Fifty years have passed since mankind developed the Network society. It was anticipated that this new infrastructure would realize a utopia where people connected with each other at the level of consciousness. However, new social problems such as personal data leaks and proliferation of manipulated information began to surface. Nevertheless, people still relied on the Network to exchange information, and proved unable to opt to abandon it.

In due course, a new Network realm with more effective security measures was developed. This was called Meta-Real Network, usually abbreviated as "the Metal."

The Metal accommodated personal memory data within protected virtual stand-alone organic cyber enclaves called bubble shells and eventually pervaded the everyday lives of people.

However, people gradually learned to release and explore their instincts within the secure environment of the Metal. The unleashed instincts of each individual pushed their consciousness to drown in the sea of information and be exposed to the pressures of desire. Meanwhile, norms and regulations continued to bind their real world lives. Thus, strange friction between the two worlds began to manifest themselves as aberrations beyond the bounds of the imaginable.
Experts who challenged the deep sea of the Metal to investigate and decipher such aberrations were called cyber divers.

This is a story of a cyber diver, Masamichi Haru, who investigates the incidents that lie between Reality and the Metal.

Characters

Main characters

The protagonist of the series. A diver of the Metal and longtime friend of Eiichiro Kushima. Masamichi was in a diving accident while testing an early Meta-Real technology, and was in a coma for 50 years before awakening as a paraplegic old man. Since the incident, he began searching for the "answer in the sea". Towards the end of the series, he eventually regains his ability to walk.

An intern hired by Masamichi Haru and sister of Souta Aoi. Originally hired to replace Holon during a leave for maintenance, she became a permanent employee after she helped guide Masamichi back from a dive gone wrong. Unlike the other humans and some animals in the story, she does not possess a Cyberbrain augmentation, and requires electronic accessories to access the Metal.

Employee of the EISF and brother of Minamo Aoi. He begins to have feelings for Holon towards the end of the series.

A Gynoid who helps Masamichi Haru with daily life in his old age and assists him in his search for the "answer in the sea".

The director of the Electronics Industry Physical and Chemical Research Institute and friend of Masamichi Haru. While as old as Masamichi, his body has the appearance of a 28-year-old man. It was revealed later in the series that Kushima chose to replace his original body with a prosthetic one, allowing him to continue his work beyond the limits allowed by the human body. He has a spare body to which he transfers his consciousness during his usual body's maintenance, one which might be modeled after the young Haru (Minamo remarked in episode 20 that his spare's appearance reminded her of Haru in his youth).

Supporting characters

The Chairwoman and First Princess of Artificial Island, Secretary General of the Council, and Souta's love interest. It is later revealed that Holon is modeled after her.

The Chairman of the Council's Advisory Committee. Like Kushima, he, too, has a prosthetic body, but it has been upgraded for military use and is armed with a stun gun.

The father of the Aoi siblings and chief of the Technical Section in the Department of Management at Denriken. Following an incident that occurred when the Metal crashed in episode 9, he resigns from his post and works as one of the lab researchers.

Other characters

Androids employed at Denriken who control and monitor the Divers' status, as well as sudden changes within the Metal. Like Holon, they all take the same appearance as Takanami.

Souta and Minamo's mother.

Souta and Minamo's grandmother.

Minamo's classmate.

Minamo's classmate.

Media

Anime

Real Drive is produced by Production I.G under the directorship of Kazuhiro Furuhashi, with series composition by Junichi Fujisaku, music by Hideki Taniuchi and Yoshihisa Hirano, characters by Tetsuo Ueyama, and produced by Takeshi Wada (Production I.G), Toshio Nakatani (NTV), Yasuo Ueda (Vap), and Yousuke Kasahara. The series aired 26 episodes on NTV, with subsequent broadcast runs on GyaO, STV, CTV, Animax, FBS, YTV, TV. Shinshu, and Tochigi TV. Thirteen DVD compilation volumes, each containing two episodes, were released by VAP between August 27, 2008 and August 21, 2009, with four DVD "Collector's Boxes" released between August 27, 2009 and May 22, 2009. The Collector's Boxes includes three to four disks, each containing two episodes, along with other bonus material.

Manga
A manga adaptation of Real Drive, illustrated by Momotarou Miyano, was serialized in Magazine Z from the June 2008 issue (Published on April 26, 2008) to the March 2009 issue (Published on January 26, 2009). Two bound volumes were released by Kodansha between August 22, 2008 and February 23, 2009 under their Kodansha Comics Z imprint.

Light novel
A light novel adaptation, called , written by Yoshinobu Akita, was published by Kodansha on August 4, 2008.

Reception

References

External links
Official site 
Production I.G Site Worklist 
Production I.G Site Worklist English Translation 

2008 anime television series debuts
2008 Japanese novels
2008 Japanese television series endings
2008 manga
2008 novels
Anime with original screenplays
Kodansha manga
Light novels
Masamune Shirow
Nippon TV original programming
Production I.G
Seinen manga
Cyberpunk anime and manga